Farkan (also Romanized as Farkān; also known as Parkān) is a village in Qaleh Asgar Rural District, Lalehzar District, Bardsir County, Kerman Province, Iran. At the 2006 census, its population was 96, in 22 families.

References 

Populated places in Bardsir County